Laura Barrett is a Canadian indie pop singer-songwriter, best known for incorporating the kalimba into her music. In addition to her solo work, Barrett has also performed as a member of The Hidden Cameras, Henri Fabergé and the Adorables, Woodhands and Sheezer.

A classically trained pianist, Barrett studied English literature and linguistics at the University of Toronto, and took up the kalimba as a hobby after buying one on eBay. Her first public performance as a solo performer was a cover of "Smells Like Nirvana" at a "Weird Al" Yankovic tribute concert (She had previously been a part of the band Lake Holiday). She subsequently released two EPs, and was the musical director for a New York City production of Maggie MacDonald's play The Rat King.

Barrett released her first full-length album, Victory Garden, in 2008 on Paper Bag Records. In December 2008 Laura Barrett was the recipient of a CBC Radio 3 Bucky Award for  "Sexiest Musician".

In 2009, Barrett took part in an interactive documentary series called City Sonic. The series, which featured 20 Toronto artists, had her talk about her first concert. The first rock concert she attended was, at the age of 12, at the Art Gallery of Ontario for the Rheostatics experimental set Music Inspired by the Group of Seven.

In 2010, Barrett accompanied The Magnetic Fields on their 11-date North American "Realism" tour.

In 2011, she participated in the National Parks Project, collaborating with musicians Cadence Weapon and Mark Hamilton and filmmaker Peter Lynch to produce and score a short film about Alberta's Waterton Lakes National Park.

References

External links
 Laura Barrett

Canadian singer-songwriters
Canadian women pianists
University of Toronto alumni
Musicians from Toronto
Living people
Canadian indie pop musicians
Paper Bag Records artists
Canadian women pop singers
21st-century Canadian women singers
21st-century Canadian pianists
The Hidden Cameras members
Year of birth missing (living people)
21st-century women pianists